Album in a Day 2 is an EP by British artist Lightspeed Champion written and recorded in a day, as a follow-up to his 2007 EP, I Wrote And Recorded This in Less Than Five Hours.

"smooth day" later appeared on Dev's second full-length studio album, Life is Sweet! Nice to Meet You, re-recorded and re-titled "Smooth Day (at the Library)".

Track listing

References

Dev Hynes albums
2008 EPs